Trigonoptera guttulata is a species of beetle in the family Cerambycidae. It was described by Gestro in 1876, originally under the genus Arsysia.

Subspecies
 Trigonoptera guttulata hannoveriana Breuning, 1973
 Trigonoptera guttulata guttulata (Gestro, 1876)

References

Tmesisternini
Beetles described in 1876